Bineh Gerd (also Romanized as Bīneh Gerd; also known as Bīn-e Gerd and Bīnegerd) is a village in Howmeh Rural District, in the Central District of Gilan-e Gharb County, Kermanshah Province, Iran. At the 2006 census, its population was 226, in 56 families.

References 

Populated places in Gilan-e Gharb County